Events in the year 1539 in Norway.

Incumbents
Monarch: Christian III

Events

 May - Hans Glaser became bergmeister in Telemark.
 Summer - Norway's first Lutheran Church Ordinance is introduced.
 Kristoffer Throndsen raids Utstein Abbey and the Bishop's Palace in Stavanger.

Arts and literature

Births
7 April – Strange Jørgenssøn, bailiff and businessman (died 1610).

Deaths

See also

References